The 2016 Philadelphia Cycling Classic was a one-day women's cycle race, held in Philadelphia on June 5 2016. The race is part of the 2016 UCI Women's World Tour.

References

Philadelphia
Philadelphia Cycling Classic
Philadelphia Cycling Classic
Philadelphia Cycling Classic